The Canadian federal budget for fiscal year 1976-1977 was presented by Minister of Finance Donald Stovel Macdonald in the House of Commons of Canada on 25 May 1976.

Changes since last budget 
On 18 December 1975 Donald Macdonald announced a temporary 10% surtax on income exceeding $30,000. The surtax only applied to the 1976 taxation year and was enacted on 24 February 1977.

External links 

 Budget Speech
 Budget Papers
 Budget in Brief

References

Canadian budgets
1976 in Canadian law
1976 government budgets
1976 in Canadian politics